John Skinner Wilson is the name of:

 John Skinner Wilson (Provost) (1849–1926), Anglican priest
 John Skinner Wilson (rugby union) (1884–1916), Scotland rugby player
 J. S. Wilson (1888–1969), Colonel John Skinner "Belge" Wilson, Scottish Scouting luminary and friend of General Baden-Powell

See also
John Wilson (disambiguation)